"Dance (Disco Heat)" is a song by American singer Sylvester. The song appears on his 1978 album Step II and features backing vocals by Two Tons O' Fun.

Chart performance
The song was Sylvester's first Top 40 hit in the United States, where it peaked at #19 on the Billboard Hot 100 chart in the fall of 1978, it also reached #29 on the UK Singles Chart. 
A 12" single was released in 1978, with "Dance (Disco Heat)" as the A-side and "You Make Me Feel (Mighty Real)" as the B-side, and these two extended dance mixes proved to be very popular in the dance clubs at the time. The two songs held down the top spot on the Billboard Dance/Disco chart for six weeks in August and September of that year  and helped to establish Sylvester's career as a noted disco and dance music performer, both in the U.S. and abroad.

References

External links
"Dance (Disco Heat)" / "You Make Me Feel (Mighty Real)" 12" single info Discogs.com.

1978 singles
Sylvester (singer) songs
Disco songs
1978 songs
Fantasy Records singles
Song recordings produced by Harvey Fuqua
Songs about dancing
Songs about disco